Herman is a town in Sheboygan County, Wisconsin, United States. The population was 2,044 at the 2000 census. It is included in the Sheboygan, Wisconsin Metropolitan Statistical Area. The unincorporated communities of Ada, Edwards, and Franklin are located in the town.

Geography
According to the United States Census Bureau, the town has a total area of 34.2 square miles (88.7 km2), of which, 34.1 square miles (88.4 km2) of it is land and 0.1 square miles (0.3 km2) of it (0.32%) is water.

Demographics
As of the census of 2000, there were 2,044 people, 574 households, and 458 families residing in the town. The population density was 59.9 people per square mile (23.1/km2). There were 592 housing units at an average density of 17.3 per square mile (6.7/km2). The racial makeup of the town was 95.40% White, 2.50% African American, 0.10% Native American, 1.08% Asian, 0.54% from other races, and 0.39% from two or more races. Hispanic or Latino of any race were 1.22% of the population.

There were 574 households, out of which 35.9% had children under the age of 18 living with them, 72.3% were married couples living together, 3.1% had a female householder with no husband present, and 20.2% were non-families. 15.7% of all households were made up of individuals, and 5.7% had someone living alone who was 65 years of age or older. The average household size was 2.76 and the average family size was 3.07.

In the town, the population was spread out, with 20.4% under the age of 18, 24.5% from 18 to 24, 25.4% from 25 to 44, 20.1% from 45 to 64, and 9.6% who were 65 years of age or older. The median age was 30 years. For every 100 females, there were 113.6 males. For every 100 females age 18 and over, there were 116.8 males.

The median income for a household in the town was $51,875, and the median income for a family was $60,568. Males had a median income of $36,841 versus $26,375 for females. The per capita income for the town was $24,007. About 2.0% of families and 5.3% of the population were below the poverty line, including 1.6% of those under age 18 and 15.2% of those age 65 or over.

Education
 Lakeland University is located in the town.

Notable people

 August Meyers, farmer, businessman, and politician, was born in the town
 William F. Sieker, farmer and politician, lived in the town. Sieker served as Herman Town Board chairman

See also
 List of towns in Wisconsin

References

External links

 Town of Herman information from Sheboygan County website

Towns in Sheboygan County, Wisconsin
Towns in Wisconsin